Teitur Matras Gestsson (born 19 August 1992) is a Faroese football goalkeeper, who currently plays for HB Tórshavn.

International career

Gestsson made his first international appearance on 1 March 2014 in a friendly match in and against Gibraltar, where he stood in the goal during the first half.

Honours
HB Tórshavn
 Faroe Islands Premier League: 2013, 2018
 Faroe Islands Cup: 2019
 Faroe Islands Super Cup: 2019

Individual
Faroe Islands Premier League Goalkeeper of the season: 2013, 2014
Faroe Islands Premier League Team of the season: 2013, 2014

References

External links
 
 
 

1992 births
Living people
Faroese footballers
Faroe Islands international footballers
Havnar Bóltfelag players
Association football goalkeepers
Faroe Islands youth international footballers
Faroe Islands under-21 international footballers